The 2005 Mongolian National Championship was the thirty-eighth recorded edition of top flight football in Mongolia and the tenth season of the Mongolian Premier League, which took over as the highest level of competition in the country from the previous Mongolian National Championship. Khoromkhon were champions, their first title, Khangarid were  runners up, with  Mazaalai in third place.

Participants
 Darkhan
 Khangarid
 Kharaatsai
 Khoromkhon
 Mazaalai

Format
The competition was played in two stages: firstly a series of first round matches of indeterminate structure. Following this, four of the five competing teams qualified for the semifinal playoffs, the winners of which advanced to a one off final, with the losers contesting a third place match.

Playoffs
Kharaatsai were eliminated in the regular stage, the other four participants proceeded to the playoff stage.

Bracket

Final

References

Mongolia Premier League seasons
Mongolia
Mongolia
football